Sherrard's Green is a village and a suburb of Malvern, Worcestershire, England, situated approximately 1.5 miles (2.4 km) southeast of Great Malvern, the  town's centre, and about  from  the Malvern suburb of Barnards Green. The village comprises   a number of council and private housing estates and the small parish church of  St Mary's, Pickersleigh, and a Tesco convenience store that opened in 2011 on the site of a former pub, The New Gas Tavern.

Transport

Rail

Bus
Several local bus services connect Sherrard's Green with the surrounding area  including the 42, S42 operated by Astons coaches stopping at Barnards Green bus shelter. Serving  areas further afield are: 
the  Malvern to  Worcester route 44, 44A, 44B operated by First Diamond serving stops  at  the  Barnards Green bus shelter and Pound Bank; The Worcester  -  Upton-upon-Severn - Malvern route 362/363 operated by Diamond serves that stops at  the Barnards Green bus shelter  and the Malvern - Gloucester - Cheltenham route 377 (Saturdays only) operated by  Diamond, stopping at  the Court Road shops and the Barnards Green bus shelter.

Air
The nearest major airport is Birmingham approximately one hour by road via the M5 and M42 motorways. Gloucestershire Airport located at Staverton, in the Borough of Tewkesbury near Malvern is a busy General Aviation airport used mainly for private charter and scheduled flights to destinations such as the islands of Jersey, Guernsey, and the Isle of Man, pilot training, and by the aircraft of emergency services.

References

Hamlets in Worcestershire